Type:Rider is a video game developed by Agat Films & Cie – Ex Nihilo and published by Bulkypix and Arte. It was released in for Microsoft Windows, Android, and iOS in 2013, for PlayStation 4 and PlayStation Vita in 2016, and for Nintendo Switch in April 2019.

The game won the award for Artistic Consistency at the 2013 European Indie Game Days.

In May 2017, it became free for PlayStation Plus subscribers.

Gameplay
Type:Rider is a puzzle-platform video game in which the player must control a colon punctuation mark through ten world based on existing typefaces from different eras. The game starts with cave paintings, then progresses to actual typefaces such as Garamond, Baskerville and Helvetica, with the final level revolving around digital fonts.

The colon can roll and jump in order to collect letters from each of the ten fonts as well as collectables such as asterisks and ampersands. Each era features pieces of arts that characterised them as well as its own soundtrack.

Reception

Review aggregator Metacritic gave the iOS version of Type:Rider a score of 83 out of 100 based on 13 reviews from critics, while the Switch version received a score of 66.

Eurogamer awarded the game with a score of 8 out of 10, praising how it manages to offer a combination of the style of Limbo and the challenges of the Trials' series while also providing a framework for educating the player about the history of typography. Pocket Gamer gave the game a score of 3.5/5, commenting positively on the originality of the settings, but reporting the presence of a "few niggling problems".

Despite having identified a few technical-related issues, TouchArcade described Type:Rider as a "intricately-designed masterpiece".

References

External links

2013 video games
2016 video games
MacOS games
Marble games
Monochrome video games
PlayStation 4 games
PlayStation Vita games
Xbox One games
Single-player video games
Video games developed in France
Windows games
Video games with silhouette graphics
BulkyPix games